Mad Dog Coll is a 1961 biographical movie directed by Burt Balaban. It marked the film debuts of both Telly Savalas and Gene Hackman.

Plot 
The film is a heavily fictionalized treatment of the life of Vincent "Mad Dog" Coll Curran, who was born in 1908 in County Donegal, Ireland. In the film, Coll is depicted as growing up with an abusive father who beats and ridicules him (the film opens with him machine-gunning his father's gravestone), and started a street gang at a very young age, which led in turn to organized crime. He is portrayed as a psychopath, incapable of fear or compassion, who is never more happy than when he is recklessly shooting people with his tommy gun or feuding with the fellow mobster Dutch Schultz over whisky hijacking.  The film ends with Coll being shot down by the police after Schultz puts a contract on him, but in fact he was arrested, tried, released, then later killed by associates of Lucky Luciano because he was making too much trouble for the syndicate. The incident where he allegedly was involved in the accidental shooting of a five-year-old boy (which led to his nickname in the press) is incorrectly associated with him shooting his way out of an attempt on his life (two boys hanging around the docks are killed), when in fact it happened as a result of a kidnapping he was accused of being part of.  Dutch Schultz is depicted by Vincent Gardenia, who was 15 years older than Chandler—Coll was only seven years younger than Schultz.

Cast 
 John Davis Chandler as Mad Dog Coll
 Kay Doubleday as Clio
 Brooke Hayward as Elizabeth
 Neil Nephew as Rocco
 Jerry Orbach as Joe Clegg
 Vincent Gardenia as Dutch Schultz
 Telly Savalas as Lt. Darro
 Glenn Cannon as Harry
 Gene Hackman as Policeman (Uncredited)

Production
Brook Hayward was cast in October 1960.

The film was distributed by Columbia.

Novelization
In June, 1961, Monarch Books released a paperback novelization of the screenplay, by Frank Castle, writing under the pseudonym Steve Thurman. The cover featured a black-and-white still of the movie and an associate standing over the bedroom "rub-out" of a bullet-ridden married couple.

Reception
The New York Times wrote that the film "belongs back in the pound."

See also 
 Mad Dog Coll, 1992 movie

References

External links 

1960s biographical films
1961 films
1960s English-language films
American crime films
American biographical films
Biographical films about gangsters
Biographical films about Depression-era gangsters
1961 crime films
Columbia Pictures films
Films directed by Burt Balaban
Films set in the 1920s
Films set in the 1930s
Cultural depictions of Mad Dog Coll
Cultural depictions of Dutch Schultz
Films scored by Stu Phillips
1960s American films